David Wolkowsky (August 25, 1919 – September 23, 2018) was an advertising developer from Key West, Florida.

Background

His grandfather, Abraham Wolkowsky, was a Russian Jewish immigrant who moved to Key West in 1886, where he initially worked as a peddler and eventually operated businesses including clothing stores, furniture stores, and saloons. The late Edna Wolkowsky was his sister. His other sister, Dr. Ruth W. Greenfield, is a musician and social activist in Miami. The photographer and filmmaker Timothy Greenfield-Sanders is his nephew. He has another nephew, Miami based attorney Joseph Lipsky, and a niece, Kim Lipsky, a congressional staffer.

Restoration and rejuvenation
Wolkowsky grew up in Key West and Miami.  Originally on a pre-med track at the University of Pennsylvania, he decided against medicine as a career and switched to architecture. After graduating from the University of Pennsylvania in 1943, he joined the merchant marine before returning to Philadelphia to restore buildings in the inner city. He is credited with having begun the rejuvenation of Society Hill and Rittenhouse Square in that city.

Wolkowsky returned to Key West in late 1962, after the death of his father, Isaac Wolkowsky. The family had a few properties in "old town" Key West and Wolkowsky decided to "retire" to Key West at the age of 40. Unable to sit still, he rescued a condemned bar on family land on Greene Street, which was the original home of "Sloppy Joe's" of Hemingway fame. From there, he developed property on lower Duval and Front Streets including "Pirate's Alley" and the "Original Cigar Factory". In 1963, Wolkowsky accomplished a major real estate coup by purchasing the old Cuban Ferry Dock, choice waterfront property near Mallory Square, for $106,000.

He transformed the Steamship office into "Tony's Fish Market", a restaurant and cocktail lounge where guests could watch shrimp boats in the channel on their way into port. He is credited with having put Key West on the road to becoming a major tourist destination.

Pier House
In 1967 Wolkowsky hired architect Yiannis B. Antonidis to help design a motel around the restaurant, with 50 unique rooms, to which 50 more rooms that faced the ocean were quickly added. The completed structure was christened "Pier House Resort Motel". Both Jimmy Buffett and Bob Marley started their careers in the hotel's funky "Chart Room Bar". Buffett credits Wolkowsky as the first to hire him.

The Pier House became a magnet for celebrities and media types, mostly because of Wolkowsky's unique personality and laissez-faire attitude. When writer Truman Capote arrived at the hotel to spend the winter he asked Wolkowsky to show him the best rooms. Capote begged Wolkowsky to rent him the trailer. Wolkowsky finally agreed and moved into a suite of rooms, in his own hotel, for the winter, to accommodate the writer. Capote's "Answered Prayers" were written in Wolkowsky's waterfront trailer. Discarded handwritten pages were often given to Wolkowsky by Capote in gratitude for allowing him to write in the trailer. Years later, the papers were stolen from Wolkowsky's penthouse apartment, high atop Key West's former Kress five and dime. Wolkowsky had restored the building, renting out the ground floor to department store "Fast Buck Freddies" and the upper floors to the Key West Parole Department. He is quoted as saying, "I never felt safer than when I lived above the Parole Board. The Capote papers were stolen by someone I know, not by a parolee".

He built a large house and guest house on the island and entertained many of his writer friends there, including Tennessee Williams and Capote. He is known for serving hot dogs, white wine and potato chips to guests including British Prime Minister Edward Heath, various Rockefellers, Mellons and Vanderbilts. During construction of the island Wolkowsky sent his private barge out to the island loaded with building supplies as well as with chocolate pudding and souffles, from The Pier House kitchens, for his laborers.

Wolkowsky continued to restore dozens of homes around Key West, as well as building the original "Reach Resort" across town. He could always be spotted, wearing several pairs of sunglasses on his head and some hanging from his neck, while driving around town in either his golf cart or his 1926 Rolls-Royce.

Awards and Noteworthy News
In 2000, Wolkowsky created a Teacher Merit Awards fund, which gives $5,000 to each of nine Key West teachers as well as a $25,000 award to a single teacher each year. About teachers in Key West, Wolkowsky was quoted in the Key West Citizen saying, "They have to be protected and nurtured".

In the mid-1990s, a street adjoining the Key West Historical Society was named "David Wolkowsky Street" in his honor.

Wolkowsky's collection of Tennessee Williams paintings were exhibited at the Jewish Museum of Florida-FIU, receiving national press coverage in the New York Times.

For his 99th birthday, Wolkowsky was profiled by Michael Adno in The Bitter Southerner, "This Man Is an Island". In addition, The Miami Herald wrote about his island's name change to Wolkowsky Island.  In 2019 the island was donated to The Nature Conservancy.

References

External links
Photo of David Wolkowsky
Florida Memory Photos

1919 births
2018 deaths
American real estate businesspeople
University of Pennsylvania alumni
American people of Russian-Jewish descent
People from Key West, Florida